Beethoven on Speed  is an album by The Great Kat, released in 1990.

Track listing
The album is divided into two opuses :

Opus One 
 "Beethoven on Speed (Beethoven's 5th Symphony in C Minor)" — 1:54
 "Ultra-Dead" — 3:19
 "Flight of the Bumble-Bee" — 2:08
 "Revenge Mongrel" — 1:33
 "Funeral March (Piano Sonata in B Minor, Arranged for guitar)" — 3:07
 "Kat-Abuse" — 1:54
 "God!" — 1:17
 "Made in Japan" — 1:48
 "Sex & Violins" — 1:28
 Opus Two 
 "Beethoven Mosh (Beethoven's 5th Symphony in C Minor)" — 2:08
 "Gripping Obsession" — 2:21
 "Paganini's 24th Caprice (Violin Caprice in a Minor, Arranged for Guitar)" — 1:52
 "Worshipping Bodies" — 2:30
 "Guitar Concerto in Blood Minor" — 2:41
 "Total Tyrant" — 2:00
 "Bach to the Future: For Geniuses ONLY!" — 0:25

External links
- Official Website with audio samples

1990 albums
The Great Kat albums